Néstor Mario Rapanelli (April 23, 1929 – February 23, 2021) was an Argentine economist, businessman (Bunge & Born), and politician. He served as Minister of Economy in 1989. He was born and died in Buenos Aires.

References

1929 births
2021 deaths
Argentine economists
Argentine Ministers of Finance
Bunge & Born
People from Buenos Aires
20th-century Argentine politicians